Xaver Hoffmann (born 22 November 1974) is a German snowboarder. He competed at the 1998 Winter Olympics, the 2002 Winter Olympics and the 2006 Winter Olympics.

References

External links
 

1974 births
Living people
German male snowboarders
Olympic snowboarders of Germany
Snowboarders at the 1998 Winter Olympics
Snowboarders at the 2002 Winter Olympics
Snowboarders at the 2006 Winter Olympics
Sportspeople from Munich
21st-century German people